The Battle of Champagne is the name of several battles fought in the Champagne region of northern France during World War I:

First Battle of Champagne (20 December 1914 – 17 March 1915)
Second Battle of Champagne (25 September – 6 October 1915)
Third Battle of Champagne (17 – 20 April 1917), or the Battle of the Hills (a diversionary attack for the better known Second Battle of the Aisne).
Fourth Battle of Champagne (15 July 1918), part of the Second Battle of the Marne.

See also:  First Battle of the Marne (5 – 12 September 1914), fought in Champagne.